Dave Alexander (born David Alexander Elam), also known as Omar Sharriff, Omar Shariff, Omar Hakim Khayam (March 10, 1938 – January 8, 2012) was an American West Coast blues singer and pianist.

Biography
Alexander was born in Shreveport, Louisiana, in 1938, and grew up in Marshall, Texas. His father was a pianist, and his mother encouraged him to play in church. Alexander joined the United States Navy in 1955. He moved to Oakland, California, in 1957, and began a long history of working with various San Francisco Bay area musicians. A self-taught pianist, he played with Big Mama Thornton, Jimmy Witherspoon, Muddy Waters, Buddy Guy and Albert Collins. In 1968, he recorded his first songs for the compilation album Oakland Blues, released by World Pacific Records. He performed at the Ann Arbor Blues and Jazz Festival in 1970 and at the San Francisco Blues Festival many times from 1973 onward. He was the warm-up act at the Last Waltz, a concert staged by the Band at the Winterland Ballroom, on Thanksgiving Day, November 25, 1976. He also performed in Europe.

Alexander recorded two albums, The Rattler (1972) and The Dirt on the Ground (1973), for Arhoolie Records, containing the songs "The Hoodoo Man (The Voodoo Woman and the Witch Doctor)", "St. James Infirmary", "Blue Tumbleweed", "Sundown", "Sufferin' with the Lowdown Blues", "Strange Woman", "Cold Feelin", "Jimmy, Is That You?", "So You Wanna Be a Man" and "The Dirt on the Ground".

In 1976, he began to perform as Omar the Magnificent, having changed his name to Omar Khayam.

He was nominated for a W. C. Handy Award in 1993.

Have Mercy! Records, a small blues label, released his album Black Widow Spider in 1993, followed by the hit Baddass in 1995 and Anatomy of a Woman in 1998.

In the 2000s Alexander lived and performed mostly in the Sacramento area, where he recorded for Have Mercy! Records. He was an articulate writer, contributing several articles to Living Blues magazine. and an advocate for the blues and African-American music.

On Martin Luther King Day in 2011, the NPR Radio program All Things Considered broadcast a segment about Marshall, Texas, as the birthplace of the boogie-woogie style of piano playing. The broadcast described how Dr. John Tennison, a boogie-woogie musicologist in San Antonio, had shared his knowledge of the history of boogie-woogie with the citizens of Marshall and had located Alexander in Sacramento. Alexander had performed in Marshall in December 2010, to great acclaim. He relocated to Marshall in February 2011 and lived there until his death.

Death
On January 8, 2012, Alexander was found dead of an apparently self-inflicted gunshot wound at his home in Marshall, Texas. He was 73 years old.

Discography

References

External links
Piano Poet Unbound: Omar Shariff 
Illustrated Dave Alexander / Omar Sharriff discography

American blues singers
American blues pianists
American male pianists
1938 births
2012 deaths
Suicides by firearm in Texas
People from Marshall, Texas
West Coast blues musicians
Musicians from Shreveport, Louisiana
20th-century American pianists
Singers from Louisiana
20th-century American male musicians
Arhoolie Records artists
2012 suicides